The 2001 California wildfire season was a series of wildfires that burned throughout the U.S. state of California during 2001.

The largest wildfire of the year in California was the Observation Fire in Lassen County, which burned 67,700 acres, and the most destructive was the Poe Fire in Butte County, which burned 133 structures. Cal Fire wildfire suppression costs for fires that burned within the agency's jurisdiction amounted to US$109 million. Damages for the same amounted to $87.3 million, with a total of 389 structures lost. At least two fatalities occurred, both of them on the Bell Fire in San Diego County.

Season narrative 
An unusually warm, dry, and windy May prompted Cal Fire to declare May 22 the beginning of fire season throughout the state, the point in the year at which the agency hires seasonal staff to be at the ready round-the-clock in California forest districts. The pattern continued through June, with fires active weeks in advance of the 'usual' beginning of fire season.

The National Interagency Fire Center declared that the country had reached National Preparedness Level 5 (the point at which incidents across the country had the "potential to exhaust all agency fire resources") on August 15, 2001, with the bulk of the fires in California Oregon, and Nevada. 

Cal Fire firefighting aircraft were temporarily grounded on September 11 by the ground stop order issued nationwide by the Federal Aviation Administration (FAA) in response to the deadly September 11 attacks in New York, Washington D.C., and Pennsylvania. The National Interagency Fire Center (NIFC) eventually instructed firefighting agencies to apply for exemptions as needed, and the restriction (which began at about 10:00 a.m.) was lifted after about three hours, when the FAA granted Cal Fire's request for exemption. The restriction affected aircraft on the Poe Fire in Butte County, among others.

All Cal Fire units were declared "off season" by December 3.

List of wildfires 
It is excerpted from Cal Fire's 2001 list of large (≥ 300 acres) fires, and may not be complete or reflect the most recent information.

See also 

 List of California wildfires

References

External links 
 California Department of Forestry and Fire Protection (Cal Fire), Statistics and Events

Lists of wildfires in the United States
Wildfires in California by year
2001 wildfires in the United States
2001 California wildfires